Orville Robinson (October 28, 1801 – December 1, 1882) was an American lawyer and politician from New York. From 1843 to 1845, he serves one term in the U.S. House of Representatives.

Early life and education
Robinson was born in Richfield, New York He studied law and was admitted to the bar in 1827.

Career 
Robinson began his career as a lawyer in Mexico, New York. He became Justice of the Peace in 1828, Town Clerk in 1829, and surrogate of Oswego County from 1830 to 1838.

Political career 
Robinson served as a member of the New York State Assembly in 1834, 1836 and 1837.

He was district attorney of Oswego County from 1841 to 1843; and Town Supervisor of Mexico in 1843. Robinson was elected as a Democrat to the 28th United States Congress, holding office from March 4, 1843 to March 3, 1845.

He moved to Oswego, New York in 1847, and was city recorder in 1853. He again served as a member of the State Assembly (Oswego Co., 1st D.) in 1856, and was elected Speaker. He was collector of customs for the District of Oswego from 1858 to 1860.

Personal life 
Robinson died in Oswego, New York. He was buried at the Riverside Cemetery.

Sources

External links 

1801 births
1882 deaths
Speakers of the New York State Assembly
Oswego County District Attorneys
People from Richfield, New York
Politicians from Oswego, New York
Democratic Party members of the United States House of Representatives from New York (state)
People from Mexico, New York
19th-century American politicians